Spilarctia groganae is a moth in the family Erebidae. It was described by Jeremy Daniel Holloway in 1976. It is found on Borneo. The habitat consists of lower and upper montane forests.

References

Moths described in 1976
groganae